Asva is a village in Saaremaa Parish, Saare County, on the eastern part of Saaremaa Island, Estonia. 

Before the administrative reform in 2017, the village was in Laimjala Parish.

Prehistoric settlement 
Asva is known in for the settlement found here in the 1930s. From the Bronze Age through the Iron Age, around 900 AD, there was a large fortified settlement. It had a very long continuity compared to other Nordic settlements. A large amount of archaeological finds, such as pottery, bone, and tool fragments have been made. Excavations have shown fortifications made by stone and earth walls.

References

Villages in Saare County